Penukal Abab Lematang Ilir Regency (often abbreviated to PALI) is a regency of South Sumatra Province, Indonesia. It takes its name from the three main rivers which flow through that area - the Penukal River, Abab River and Lematang River - while the name Ilir means "downstream" (it denote the downstream part of the Lematang River). Talang Ubi is the administrative centre of this regency. The regency borders Musi Banyuasin Regency to the north, Banyuasin Regency, and Muara Enim Regency to the east and the south, and by Musi Rawas Regency, and Muara Enim Regency to the west.

The regency was established on 14 December 2012, comprising five districts which were formerly part of Muara Enim Regency. These five districts had a combined area of 1,840.00 km2 and a population of 165,474 at the 2010 Census and 194,900 at the 2020 Census.

Administrative districts
Penukal Abab Lematang Ilir Regency is composed of the following five districts (kecamatan), listed below with their areas and populations at the 2010 Census and 2020 Census. The table also includes the locations of the district administrative centres, the number of villages (rural desa and urban kelurahan) in each district, and its postal code.

Not: (a) the four villages forming Talang Ubi town (Talang Ubi Barat, Talang Ubi Selatan, Talang Ubi Timur and Talang Ubi Utara) together cover 128.36 km2 with a population of 34,330 at the 2020 Census.(b) of which 7 are urban kelurahan and 13 are rural desa. 
(c) 17 villages within the district share the postcode of 31214 (including Talang Ubi Utara); the others are Talang Ubi Barat (with postcode of 31211), Talang Ubi Selatan (with postcode of 31212) and Talang Ubi Timur (with postcode of 31213).

References

Regencies of South Sumatra